The Flag of the Murmansk Oblast of Russia consists of two horizontal bands of blue and red, the blue being four times wider than the red. Within the blue is a stylized yellow aurora, which takes up two fifths of the width of the flag. The aurora represents the fact that the Murmansk Oblast is north of the Arctic Circle. The blue represents beauty and greatness, and the red represents courage and strength. The flag is the winner of a design contest which was officially adopted on July 1st, 2004.

References

Murmansk
Murmansk Oblast
Murmansk